Brunko Iliev (born 22 November 1945) is a Bulgarian volleyball player. He competed in the men's tournament at the 1972 Summer Olympics.

References

1945 births
Living people
Bulgarian men's volleyball players
Olympic volleyball players of Bulgaria
Volleyball players at the 1972 Summer Olympics
Sportspeople from Pleven